The Second Sin is a 1966 South African film written by Ivan Goff and Ben Roberts.

References

External links
The Second Sin at IMDb
The Second Sin at BFI

1966 films
English-language South African films